Lists of Americans are lists of people from the United States. They are grouped by various criteria, including ethnicity, religion, state, city, occupation and educational affiliation.

By ethnicity or place of origin

 Afghan Americans
 African Americans
 Albanian Americans
 Amish Americans
 Angolan Americans
 Antiguan and Barbudan Americans
 Arab Americans
 Argentine Americans
 Armenian Americans
 Asian Americans
 Assyrian Americans
 Asturian Americans
 Australian Americans
 Austrian Americans
 Azerbaijani Americans
 Bahamian Americans
 Bangladeshi Americans
 Barbadian Americans
 Basque Americans
 Belarusian Americans
 Belgian Americans
 Belizean Americans
 Beninese Americans
 Berber Americans
 Bermudian Americans
 Bolivian Americans
 Bosnian Americans
 Brazilian Americans
 Bulgarian Americans
 Burmese Americans
 Cajuns
 Cambodian Americans
 Cameroonian Americans
 Canadian Americans
 Catalan Americans
 Chechen Americans
 Chilean Americans
 Chinese Americans
 Colombian Americans
 Congolese Americans
 Coptic Americans
 Cossack Americans
 Costa Rican Americans
 Croatian Americans
 Cuban Americans
 Cypriot Americans
 Czech Americans
 Danish Americans
 Dominican Americans (Dominica)
 Dominican Americans (Dominican Republic)
 Dutch Americans
 Ecuadorian Americans
 Egyptian Americans
 Emirati Americans
 English Americans
 Estonian Americans
 Ethiopian Americans
 Fijian Americans
 Filipino Americans
 Finnish Americans
 French Americans
 Fuzhounese Americans
 Galician Americans
 Gambian Americans
 Georgian Americans
 German Americans
 Ghanaian Americans
 Greek Americans
 Guatemalan Americans
 Guinean Americans
 Guyanese Americans
 Haitian Americans
 Hakka Americans
 Hispanic and Latino Americans
 Hmong Americans
 Honduran Americans
 Hong Kong Americans
 Hungarian Americans
 Icelandic Americans
 Indian Americans
 Indo-Caribbean Americans
 Indonesian Americans
 Iranian Americans
 Iraqi Americans
 Irish Americans
 Israeli Americans
 Italian Americans
 Ivorian Americans
 Jamaican Americans
 Japanese Americans
 Kalmyk Americans
 Kazakh Americans
 Kenyan Americans
 Korean Americans
 Kuwaiti Americans
 Laotian Americans
 Latvian Americans
 Lebanese Americans
 Liberian Americans
 Lithuanian Americans
 Louisiana Creoles
 Luxembourg Americans
 Macedonian Americans
 Malawian Americans
 Malian Americans
 Malaysian Americans
 Māori Americans
 Mexican Americans
 Monegasque Americans
 Montenegrin Americans
 Moroccan Americans
 Native Americans
 Native Hawaiians
 Nepalese Americans
 New Zealand Americans
 Nicaraguan Americans
 Nigerian Americans
 Norwegian Americans
 Pakistani Americans
 Palauan Americans
 Palestinian Americans
 Panamanian Americans
 Paraguayan Americans
 Peruvian Americans
 Polish Americans
 Portuguese Americans
 Stateside Puerto Ricans
 Romani Americans
 Romanian Americans
 Russian Americans
 Rusyn Americans
 Salvadoran Americans
 Scotch-Irish Americans
 Scottish Americans
 Senegalese Americans
 Serbian Americans
 Sicilian Americans
 Singaporean Americans
 Slovak Americans
 Slovene Americans
 Somali Americans
 South African Americans
 South Sudanese Americans
 Spanish Americans
 Sri Lankan Americans
 Sudanese Americans
 Surinamese Americans
 Swedish Americans
 Swiss Americans
 Syrian Americans
 Taiwanese Americans
 Tajikistani Americans
 Tanzanian Americans
 Thai Americans
 Tibetan Americans
 Tongan Americans
 Trinidadian and Tobagonian Americans
 Tunisian Americans
 Turkish Americans
 Ugandan Americans
 Ukrainian Americans
 Uruguayan Americans
 Uzbek Americans
 Venezuelan Americans
 Vietnamese Americans
 Welsh Americans

By religion
 American atheists
 American Christians 
 American Jews
 American Muslims
 American Hindus
 American Buddhists

By first-level sub-divisions in the U.S.

States 

 Alabama 
 Alaska
 Arizona
 Arkansas
 California
 Colorado
 Connecticut
 Delaware
 Florida
 Georgia
 Hawaii
 Idaho
 Illinois
 Indiana
 Iowa
 Kansas
 Kentucky
 Louisiana
 Maine
 Maryland
 Massachusetts
 Michigan
 Minnesota
 Mississippi
 Missouri
 Montana
 Nebraska
 Nevada
 New Hampshire
 New Jersey
 New Mexico
 New York
 North Carolina
 North Dakota
 Ohio
 Oklahoma
 Oregon
 Pennsylvania
 Rhode Island
 South Carolina
 South Dakota
 Tennessee
 Texas
 Utah
 Vermont
 Virginia
 Washington
 West Virginia
 Wisconsin
 Wyoming

Territories (insular areas)

 American Samoa
 Guam
 Northern Mariana Islands
 Puerto Rico
 United States Virgin Islands

Federal District 

 District of Columbia

By U.S. cities

By occupation

By educational affiliation

Miscellaneous
 List of Americans who married international nobility
 List of naturalized American citizens
 List of Ellis Island immigrants

See also 

 American diaspora